The Church of Jesus Christ of Latter-day Saints in Micronesia may refer to:

The Church of Jesus Christ of Latter-day Saints in Kiribati
The Church of Jesus Christ of Latter-day Saints in Nauru
The Church of Jesus Christ of Latter-day Saints in Palau
The Church of Jesus Christ of Latter-day Saints in the Federated States of Micronesia
The Church of Jesus Christ of Latter-day Saints in the Mariana Islands (Guam & Northern Mariana Islands)
The Church of Jesus Christ of Latter-day Saints in the Marshall Islands